Dicliptera sexangularis, the sixangle foldwing, is a flowering plant in the genus Dicliptera and the family Acanthaceae. It has red blooms and is a perennial. In the United States it grows in Florida and Texas. It has also been reported in parts of the Caribbean, Central America, and Venezuela. It is a dicot.

References

Acanthaceae